The 2022 Malaysia Masters (officially known as the Perodua Malaysia Masters 2022 presented by Daihatsu for sponsorship reasons) was a badminton tournament that took place at the Axiata Arena, Kuala Lumpur, Malaysia, from 5 to 10 July 2022 and had a total prize of US$360,000.

Tournament
The 2022 Malaysia Masters was the thirteenth tournament of the 2022 BWF World Tour and was part of the Malaysia Masters championships, which had been held since 2009. This tournament was organized by the Badminton Association of Malaysia with sanction from the BWF.

Venue
This international tournament was held at the Axiata Arena inside the KL Sports City in Kuala Lumpur, Malaysia.

Point distribution
Below is the point distribution table for each phase of the tournament based on the BWF points system for the BWF World Tour Super 500 event.

Prize pool
The total prize money was US$360,000 with the distribution of the prize money in accordance with BWF regulations.

Men's singles

Seeds 

 Viktor Axelsen (withdrew)
 Kento Momota (second round)
 Anders Antonsen (withdrew)
 Chou Tien-chen (quarter-finals)
 Lee Zii Jia (withdrew)
 Anthony Sinisuka Ginting (quarter-finals)
 Jonatan Christie (first round)
 Ng Ka Long (final)

Finals

Top half

Section 1

Section 2

Bottom half

Section 3

Section 4

Women's singles

Seeds 

 Akane Yamaguchi (quarter-finals)
 Tai Tzu-ying (semi-finals)
 An Se-young (champion)
 Chen Yufei (final)
 Carolina Marín (withdrew)
 Nozomi Okuhara (quarter-finals)
 P. V. Sindhu (quarter-finals)
 Ratchanok Intanon (quarter-finals)

Finals

Top half

Section 1

Section 2

Bottom half

Section 3

Section 4

Men's doubles

Seeds 

 Marcus Fernaldi Gideon / Kevin Sanjaya Sukamuljo (withdrew)
 Takuro Hoki / Yugo Kobayashi (quarter-finals)
 Mohammad Ahsan / Hendra Setiawan (final)
 Lee Yang / Wang Chi-lin (withdrew)
 Aaron Chia / Soh Wooi Yik (semi-finals)
 Fajar Alfian / Muhammad Rian Ardianto (champions)
 Kim Astrup / Anders Skaarup Rasmussen (first round)
 Ong Yew Sin / Teo Ee Yi (withdrew)

Finals

Top half

Section 1

Section 2

Bottom half

Section 3

Section 4

Women's doubles

Seeds 

 Chen Qingchen / Jia Yifan (champions)
 Lee So-hee / Shin Seung-chan (quarter-finals)
 Kim So-yeong / Kong Hee-yong (withdrew)
 Yuki Fukushima / Sayaka Hirota (second round)
 Mayu Matsumoto / Wakana Nagahara (second round)
 Nami Matsuyama / Chiharu Shida (final)
 Jongkolphan Kititharakul / Rawinda Prajongjai (second round)
 Gabriela Stoeva / Stefani Stoeva (second round)

Finals

Top half

Section 1

Section 2

Bottom half

Section 3

Section 4

Mixed doubles

Seeds 

 Dechapol Puavaranukroh / Sapsiree Taerattanachai (second round)
 Zheng Siwei / Huang Yaqiong (champions)
 Yuta Watanabe / Arisa Higashino (quarter-finals)
 Wang Yilyu / Huang Dongping (quarter-finals)
 Praveen Jordan / Melati Daeva Oktavianti (withdrew)
 Tang Chun Man / Tse Ying Suet (first round)
 Tan Kian Meng / Lai Pei Jing (withdrew)
 Mark Lamsfuß / Isabel Lohau (first round)

Finals

Top half

Section 1

Section 2

Bottom half

Section 3

Section 4

References

External links
 Tournament Link

Malaysia Masters
Malaysia Masters
Malaysia Masters
Malaysia Masters